"I Idolize You" is a song written and produced by Ike Turner. It was released by Ike & Tina Turner in 1960 as the second single from their debut album The Soul of Ike & Tina Turner.

Overview
After years with male front-men backing his Kings of Rhythm band, Ike Turner had finally found success after his vocalist Tina Turner recorded "A Fool in Love". The song made Tina Turner a rising R&B star, and Ike Turner had his biggest hit as a songwriter since "Rocket 88" nearly a decade before. After Sue Records signed the act to their label, the duo had a string hits and toured constantly when they weren't recording.

Ike Turner wrote and produced "I Idolize You" which shares some similarities to "A Fool in Love" down from the doo-wop backing vocals by The Ikettes in contrast to Tina's raspy, growling belt to even the piano melody. Released in November 1960, the song was their second hit single. It peaked at No. 5 on the Billboard R&B chart and crossed over to the Billboard Hot 100 at No. 82.

This song would be one of several songs Ike & Tina Turner would re-record over the years. The duo recorded an updated version of "I Idolize You" in 1966 for their album River Deep - Mountain High. It was released as a B-side single on Philles Records in 1967.

Critical reception 
The record was selected for Cash Box magazine's Pick of the Week.

Cash Box (November 1, 1960): Team's follow-up to their big pop-r&b dual-mart'er, "A Fool In Love," can also come thru in winning style. Tune, "I Idolize You," is set to an enticing middle beat rhythm and wailed with conviction by Tina. Ike's ork and vocal group supply the tantalizing background sounds. A slow shuffle rhythm sets the pace for Tina's infectious reading on the lower lid.

Track listing

Chart performance

Weekly charts

Year-end charts

Credits
Lead vocal by Tina Turner
Background vocals by The Ikettes
Instrumentation by Ike Turner and The Kings of Rhythm
Written and produced by Ike Turner

References

1960 singles
Ike & Tina Turner songs
Songs written by Ike Turner
Song recordings produced by Ike Turner
1960 songs
Sue Records singles
Philles Records singles